Andrew Beck (born May 15, 1996) is an American football fullback for the Houston Texans of the National Football League (NFL). He played college football at Texas.

Early years
Beck attended and played high school football at Henry B. Plant High School.

College career
Beck was a member of the Texas Longhorns football team for five seasons. He became a starter at tight end and H-back for the team as a sophomore, catching eight passes for 77 yards while serving primarily as a blocker. In his junior season, Beck caught four passes for 82 yards and two touchdowns while blocking for the nation's leading rusher, D'Onta Foreman. He missed the entirety of his senior season and was forced to use a medical redshirt after breaking his foot in a preseason practice. As a redshirt senior, Beck had 28 receptions for 281 yards and two touchdowns and was named first-team All-Big 12 Conference.

Professional career

New England Patriots
Beck signed with the New England Patriots as an undrafted free agent on May 4, 2019, after agreeing to a guaranteed salary of $115,000, making him the highest paid undrafted signing by the team. The Patriots moved Beck to the fullback position at the start of training camp. He was waived during final roster cuts on August 30, 2019.

Denver Broncos
Beck was claimed off waivers by the Denver Broncos on September 1, 2019, to serve as the team's fullback after an injury to starter Andy Janovich. Beck made his NFL debut in the Broncos season opener of September 9, against the Oakland Raiders. He made his first career start on September 22, 2019, against the Green Bay Packers, playing 23 snaps at fullback. Beck caught a one-yard pass from Drew Lock for his first career touchdown on December 29, 2019, in a 16-15 win over the Oakland Raiders.

Beck was placed on the reserve/COVID-19 list by the Broncos on July 30, 2020. He was activated on August 17, 2020. He was placed on injured reserve on October 31 with a hamstring injury. He was activated on December 5, 2020.

On December 21, 2021, Beck was placed on injured reserve.
On February 10, 2022, Beck was awarded the NFL's Salute to Service Award, presented by USAA annually. 

On March 14, 2022, Beck signed a one-year contract extension with the Broncos.

Houston Texans
On March 17, 2023, Beck signed a two-year contract with the Houston Texans.

References

External links
Texas Longhorns bio
Denver Broncos bio

Living people
1996 births
American football fullbacks
American football tight ends
Denver Broncos players
Houston Texans players
New England Patriots players
Players of American football from Tampa, Florida
Texas Longhorns football players
Henry B. Plant High School alumni